Zenobiellina is a genus of air-breathing land snails, terrestrial pulmonate gastropod mollusks in the subfamily Hygromiinae  of the family Hygromiidae, the hairy snails and their allies.

Species in this genus of snail create and use love darts as part of their mating behavior.

Species
Species within the genus Zenobiellina include:
 Zenobiellina graminicola Holyoak, D. T. & Holyoak, G. A., 2018
 Zenobiellina subrufescens (J. S. Miller, 1822)

References

 Holyoak, D. T. & Holyoak, G. A. (2018). A new genus Zenobiellina for Helix subrufescens Miller, 1822 (Hygromiidae), with description of a new congeneric species from northern Spain. Iberus. 36 (2): 133–147.

External links
 Gude, G. K. & Woodward, B. B. (1921). On Helicella, Férussac. Proceedings of the Malacological Society of London. 14 (5/6): 174-190. London

Hygromiidae